Tate Russell (born 24 August 1999) is an Indigenous Australian footballer who plays as a right back for Western Sydney Wanderers in the A-League.

Career
From Wollongong, Russell began his career in 2003 with the Wollongong Olympic Junior club before joining Football NSW's Project 22 in 2008. He soon joined the South Coast Wolves in 2010 and stayed with the club for four years before joining the youth ranks at Western Sydney Wanderers.

Western Sydney Wanderers
Russell was part of the 2017-18 Y-League championship winning Western Sydney Wanderers Youth team. He played the full game as they beat Melbourne City Youth 3-1 in the 2018 Y-League Grand Final on 3 February 2018.

Russell signed his first contract with Western Sydney Wanderers on 6 June 2018, penning a two-year scholarship deal with the club. He made his professional debut for Western Sydney in their Round 11 clash with Melbourne Victory on 5 January 2019, playing the full game as the Wanderers lost 2-1 at ANZ Stadium.

Russell scored his first professional goal in a Round of 16 clash against Sydney United in the 2019 FFA Cup on 28 August 2019, driving a low volley into the bottom corner for the Wanderers' fifth as they ran out 7-1 winners.

International
Russell has four caps for the Australia U20 side.

Career statistics

Personal life
Son of former Rugby league player Ian Russell.

Honours

Club
Western Sydney Wanderers
Y-League: 2017–18

References

External links 
 Western Sydney Wanderers Profile.

1999 births
Living people
Sportspeople from Wollongong
Australian soccer players
Western Sydney Wanderers FC players
Association football defenders
Indigenous Australian soccer players
A-League Men players